Enid Legros-Wise  (born 1943) is a Canadian ceramic artist working mainly in porcelain.

Early life
She was born in 1943 in Gaspé, Quebec. She studied at the École des beaux-arts de Montréal, from 1961–64 and then at the Institut des Arts-Appliqués, also at Montréal, from 1964-66. When she finished her studies in Montreal she went to live and study in Paris. From 1966 to 1969 she studied in the studio of Francine DelPierre.

Work

The artist works in fine porcelain beginning in the 1970s. In her recent work includes a large installation entitled "Veritas" which consists of one thousand porcelain cups to represent the collective search for truth. This work uses a simple everyday object to engage the public in the artistic process. Enid Legros-Wise lives and works in her native Gaspé Peninsula in Quebec. Her works cover a wide spectrum of ceramics, although her main interest is in fine porcelain  Her work has gained her international recognition for the scope and quality of her porcelain creations.

Exhibitions
2007
″Seduced by Clay″, Lambton Art Gallery

Awards 
Enid Legros-Wise has earned a number of awards and honours including
 The Croix de Chevalier in France (two distinctions),
 The Sarajevo Prize awarded at the First World Triennial of Small Ceramics, Yugoslavia 1984 
 Gaspesian Cultural Merit Award, Gaspe, Quebec, 1996
 Royal Canadian Academy of Arts, Induction 2007

Publications

By the Artist
 The Creative Process by Enid LeGros-Wise, 1st edition, 1997

About the Artist
Gaspésie des artistes  By Line Goyette, Christian Lamontagne Les Editions Fides, 2006, 123 pages, Legros-Wise at pages 105 - 109.
"Working with Clay, 2nd Ed.," Susan Peterson, 2002.
"Containment: The Space Within." Canadian Clay and Glass Gallery, Waterloo, Ontario, 1994.
"Gaspésie, Visages et Paysages," Jules Bélanger, 1984.
"Ceramic Spectrum," Robin Hopper, 1984.
"The Craftsman's Way," Hart Massey and John Flanders, 1981.

References

External links
Official web site

1943 births
Canadian ceramists
Living people
People from Gaspé, Quebec
École des beaux-arts de Montréal alumni
Canadian women ceramists
Members of the Royal Canadian Academy of Arts